Chennaiyin Football Club Reserves and Academy also known as Chennaiyin FC B is the youth system of Indian Super League side Chennaiyin. Based in Chennai, Tamil Nadu, the reserve side was founded on 12 January 2018 and participated in I-League 2nd Division, the second division of Indian football. Club's academy teams were founded on 28 August 2017 and under 18 side participates in Youth League U18, the highest level for youth football in India. They also sometimes join the Chennai Football League.

The reserve side is currently coached by Cleofas Alex, who also runs all of the youth development for Chennaiyin.

Reserves

History
On 12 January 2018, it was announced by Chennaiyin, a club that competes in the Indian Super League, that they would form a "B" team that would serve as their reserve team. They first participated in I-League 2nd Division. Syed Sabir Pasha, the club's technical director for youth development, was also announced as the team's first head coach while the club also announced the first seven signings from the AIFF Elite Academy.

The team played their first match on 13 January 2018 in the Don Bosco - Fr. McFerran Trophy All India Football Tournament against ICF. Bedashwor Singh scored the first goal for Chennaiyin FC B as they won 1–0.

Squad

Statistics and records

Season-by-season

Head Coaches record

Academy

History
On 28 August 2017, on Chennaiyin's third year of existence, the club announced the formation of three age group teams that would participate in the All India Football Federation operated youth leagues at the under-18, under-15, and under-13 levels. During the launch of the teams, Syed Sabir Pasha, the club's youth technical director said that the under-15 and under-13 teams would consist of players only from Tamil Nadu while players from other regions could make the under-18 side.

Honours

Cup
Stafford Challenge Cup
Runners-up (1): 2023

See also

 Chennaiyin FC

References

External links

 

Chennaiyin FC B
Football clubs in Chennai
Indian reserve football teams
Football academies in India
Association football clubs established in 2018
I-League 2nd Division clubs
2017 establishments in India